Xu can refer to the following Chinese surnames that are homographs when Romanized using their Mandarin pronunciations:
 Xu (surname 徐)
 Xu (surname 許)
 Xu (surname 須)

The tones of these surnames are different in Mandarin, but if the tone diacritics are omitted then both surnames would be spelled Xu in pinyin, and Hsü in the Wade–Giles system or Hsu if the diaeresis is also omitted.

Chinese-language surnames
Multiple Chinese surnames